The Temple of Hercules Musarum (Latin: Aedes Herculis Musarum) was a temple dedicated to Hercules in ancient Rome, near the Circus Flaminius.

The temple was built by Marcus Fulvius Nobilior, who conquered the Greek city of Ambracia in 189 BC. It was probably completed and dedicated during his triumph in 187 BC. The epithet 'Musarum' means 'of the Muses' and refers to Nobilior's discovery that Hercules was known in Greece as 'Musagetes' or 'leader of the Muses'. The temple contained copies of the fasti and statues taken from Ambracia, including statues of the Muses. The Portico of Metellus was later built near the temple.

In 29 BC, Lucius Marcius Philippus restored the temple and built a portico around it, later known as the Porticus Philippi or Portico of Philippus. Part of the temple's floorplan is known from a fragment (number 33) of the 3rd century Forma Urbis Romae.

References

External links
http://penelope.uchicago.edu/Thayer/E/Gazetteer/Places/Europe/Italy/Lazio/Roma/Rome/_Texts/PLATOP*/Aedes_Herculis_Musarum.html

Hercules Musarum
180s BC establishments
2nd-century BC establishments in Italy
2nd-century BC establishments in the Roman Republic
Temples of Heracles
2nd-century BC religious buildings and structures
Destroyed temples
Hercules